The following lists events that happened during 2018 in Hungary.

Incumbents
President: János Áder
Prime Minister: Viktor Orbán
Speaker of the National Assembly: László Kövér

Events

April
 April 8 – Viktor Orbán's Fidesz–KDNP alliance, Wins the Hungarian 2018 elections in a Landslide preserving its two-thirds majority.  Orbán and Fidesz campaigned primarily on the issues of immigration and foreign meddling, and the election was seen as a victory for right-wing populism in Europe.

May
 May 16 – George Soros Open Society Foundations announce they will move its office from Budapest to Berlin amid Hungarian government interference.

June
 June 2 – After its poor election performance, the opposition party Together is dissolved.
 June 20 – Hungarian Parliament has pass the "Stop Soros law", for anyone "facilitating illegal immigration" will face a year in jail.
 June – two former Jobbik MPs László Toroczkai and Dóra Dúró form their own nationalist party Our Home Movement.

October
 October – A government decree signed by Hungarian Prime Minister Viktor Orban came into force, removing gender studies from the list of master's programmes. The subject will be banned at Hungarian universities.

December
 December 3 – Central European University announced it would cease operations in Hungary and relocate to Vienna, after the Hungarian government's refusal to sign an agreement allowing it to continue operations in Hungary.

Deaths

January

 6 January – Elza Brandeisz, 110, Hungarian dancer and teacher, conferred Righteous Among the Nations.
 28 January – József Merényi, 89, Hungarian Olympic speed skater (1952).
 31 January – István Marosi, 73, Hungarian Olympic handball player (1972).

February

 3 February – Károly Palotai, 82, Hungarian football player and referee, Olympic champion (1964).
 4 February – Etelka Barsi-Pataky, 76, Hungarian politician, MEP (2004–2009).
 9 February – István Hevesi, 86, Hungarian water polo player, Olympic champion (1956).

March

 4 March – Ernő Rozgonyi, 84, Hungarian politician, MP (1998–2002, 2010–2014).

April

 1 April – Etelka Keserű, 92, Hungarian politician, Minister of Light Industry (1971–1980).

See also
List of Hungarian films since 1990

References

 
2010s in Hungary
Years of the 21st century in Hungary
Hungary
Hungary